The Staib LB-1 Special is a homebuilt aircraft design of Wilbur Staib.

Design and development
Wilbur Staib (1914-1993) was a self-taught aircraft designer from Diamond, Missouri. Staib served as a flight instructor during the  Second World War at Chanute, Kansas flying PT-14s. He designed and built five different "LB" (Little Bastard) aircraft and a helicopter, of which several had the title "world's smallest". He flew his aircraft in air shows with the title "The Diamond Wizard".

The LB-1 was a single engine, open cockpit biplane with conventional landing gear. The low-cost construction included using brazed steel bedspring wire for wing-ribs, and bed-sheet muslin covering. The airfoil was patterned on a Taylorcraft BC-12D. The aircraft used three fuel tanks: one in the headrest, one in the baggage compartment and one against the firewall. The red and white checkerboard-painted aircraft was outfitted with a smoke system for air show work.

Operational history
Staib used the LB-1 to perform on the pro-akro circuit, performing stunts such as inverted ribbon cuts. His LB-1 was comparable to the Pitts Special flown by Betty Skelton at the same shows. The aircraft performed from 1949 to 1952. The prototype was registered as late as 1990.

Specifications (Staib LB-1)

See also

References

External links
Image of a LB-5 at the Mid-America Air Museum

Homebuilt aircraft
Biplanes
Single-engined tractor aircraft